Club Social Cultural Deportivo Llacuabamba is a Peruvian football club, based in the Department of La Libertad, Pataz, La Libertad. The club was founded in 2011 and currently play in the Liga 2 tournament.

History
In 2019 Copa Perú, the club was promoted to the Peruvian Primera División after drawing with Carlos Stein in the Final group stage.

Honours

National

League
Cuadrangular de Ascenso:
Runner-up (1): 2019

Copa Perú:
Runner-up (1): 2019

Regional 
Liga Departamental de La Libertad:
Runner-up (1): 2019

Liga Provincial de Pataz:
Winners (1): 2019

Liga Distrital de Parcoy:
Winners (1): 2019

Current squad

Out on loan

Players with dual citizenship
  TBA

See also 
List of football clubs in Peru
Peruvian football league system

References 

Football clubs in Peru
Association football clubs established in 2011
2011 establishments in Peru